The Bishop of Dresden-Meissen is the ordinary of the Roman Catholic Diocese of Dresden-Meissen in the Archdiocese of Berlin.

The name was changed to Dresden-Meissen on 15 November 1979.

Bishops and administrators of Meissen (968–1581)

The Bishops resided until 1595 in Wurzen. In 1559 the diocesan temporalities within Saxony were seized by the Electorate of Saxony.

Apostolic prefects of Meissen (1567–1921) 
In the Meisen diocesan area located outside of then Saxony in Lower and Upper Lusatia there was no immediate overlord, since the then liege lord of the Two Lusatias, the Catholic king of Bohemia (in personal union Holy Roman Emperor) held the Lusatias as fief outright. The Kings of Bohemia did not effectively offend the spreading of the Protestant Reformation in the Two Lusatias. So it depended on the local vassals if Lutheranism prevailed or not, following the principle of Cuius regio, eius religio. The Two Lusatias thus became an area of regionally altering predominant denomination. In 1560 Meissen's last bishop John IX had appointed Johannes Leisentritt as diocesan administrator for the Lusatian part of the diocese, seated in Bautzen. After the Holy See had recognised as a matter of fact the suppression of the Meissen diocese within Saxony it converted its Lusatian part into an apostolic prefecture (Apostolic Prefecture of Meissen) in 1567 with administrator Leisentrit elevated to prefect. In canon law an apostolic prefecture is a diocese on approval. 

According to its seat or its area comprised the prefecture was alternatively also called Apostolic Prefecture of Bautzen or Apostolic Prefecture of the Two Lusatias, respectively. When in 1635 the Lutheran Electorate of Saxony annexed the Two Lusatias it guaranteed in the cession contract (Traditionsrezess) with Bohemia to leave the existing religious relations untouched. As a signatory of the Peace of Westphalia of 1648 Saxony later agreed to maintain the religious status quo as given in the reference year of 1624 in all its territories acquired since. After the Prussian annexation of Lower Lusatia and easterly Upper Lusatia in 1815 the Holy See disentangled the newly Prussian diocesan area and incorporated it into the Prussian diocese of Breslau in 1821. The remaining diocese, officially always called Apostolic Prefecture of Meissen, was thus also called the Apostolic Prefecture of (Saxon) Upper Lusatia. The office of the apostolic prefect was held in personal union by the cathedral dean of Bautzen Cathedral. In the 19th century the episcopal function of the apostolic prefects was further emphasised by appointing them simultaneously with titular sees.

Bishops of Meissen (and Dresden-Meissen as of 1980; 1921–present)
(Dates in italics indicate de facto continuation of office)

Notes

See also
Lists of incumbents

968 establishments
Dresden-Meissen
10th-century establishments in Europe
Dresden Cathedral